Honeyri-ye Yek (also Romanized as Honeyrī-ye Yek; also known as Haneyrī and Homaireh) is a village in Mollasani Rural District, in the Central District of Bavi County, Khuzestan Province, Iran. At the 2006 census, its population was 131, in 25 families.

References 

Populated places in Bavi County